A Bastard's Tale is an action 2D video game, published by Swedish studio No Pest Productions for PlayStation 4 and Microsoft Windows.

Gameplay
The game features basic pixilated-base graphics and features  the player defeating fifteen different enemy characters which are having their own distinct features, throughout five levels.

References

2015 video games
Action video games
PlayStation 4 games
Video games developed in Sweden
Windows games